Karl Leopold William Core (December 4, 1875 – February 1, 1929) was an American football player and coach. He served as the head football coach at Ohio University in 1900, compiling a record of 2–4–1.

After retiring from football, he was a high-ranking official at the Pittsburgh Plate Glass Company.

Head coaching record

References

External links
 

1875 births
1929 deaths
Greensburg Athletic Association players
Ohio Bobcats football coaches
Washington & Jefferson Presidents football players
People from Greensburg, Pennsylvania
Players of American football from Pennsylvania